San Pasqual Valley, historically spelt as San Pascual (Spanish for "Saint Paschal"), is the northernmost community of the city of San Diego.  It is named for the Kumeyaay village of San Pasqual that was once located there.  It is bordered on the north by the city of Escondido, on the east and west by unincorporated land within San Diego County, and on the south by the city of Poway and the community of Rancho Bernardo. San Pasqual Valley is home to the San Diego Zoo Safari Park.

State Highway 78 runs through the valley between Escondido and Ramona. The valley is part of the Santa Ysabel Creek watershed, which drains into the San Dieguito River.

History

In pre-Hispanic times the Kumeyaay had lived for centuries in the San Pasqual Valley. Following the closing of the missions by the Mexican government in 1833, the Kumeyaay moved back to the San Pasqual Valley and the Kumeyaay pueblo of San Pasqual was established on November 16, 1835. The pueblo defended itself from Quechan (or Yuman) incursions in the mid 1800s.

The wagon road from Warner's Ranch to San Diego passed through San Pasqual Valley on its way between Santa Ysabel Asistencia and Rancho Santa Maria de Los Peñasquitos. In 1846, during the Mexican–American War, this road led to the Battle of San Pasqual being fought in the valley near the site of the Kumeyaay village of San Pasqual. On December 6 and December 7, 1846, the Californios, led by General Don Andrés Pico, fought Stephen W. Kearny's column of 140 U.S. Army troops as they descended from the Santa Maria Valley into the valley near San Pasqual on their way from Warner's Ranch to San Diego. Subsequently, it was the road into San Diego County from the Southern Emigrant Trail.

From 1857 to 1860 this same wagon road was part of the 125-mile stagecoach road for the San Antonio-San Diego Mail Line between Carrizo Creek Station and San Diego.  San Pasqual village was a way station on that road 28 miles from Santa Ysabel and 16 miles from Rancho Santa Maria de Los Peñasquitos.

The Kumeyaay of San Pasqual were evicted from their land and homes in 1878 by San Diego County authorities. They have become known as the San Pasqual Band of Diegueno Mission Indians.

In 1972, the San Diego Zoo Safari Park opened as the San Diego Wild animal park.

Climate
The San Pasqual Valley has a borderline semi-arid climate (Köppen climate classification: Bsh) and hot-summer Mediterranean climate (Csa) with hot, dry summers and cool, wet winters. Winter nights in the San Pasqual Valley are much colder than elsewhere in San Diego, with the lowest temperatures being well below freezing most winters.

Places of interest

Much of the valley is part of the San Pasqual Valley Agricultural Preserve, and home to citrus, avocado, and dairy farms. It includes the San Pasqual Valley AVA, an area designated an American Viticultural Area by the US Bureau of Alcohol, Tobacco, Firearms and Explosives. The valley experiences very hot days and ocean-cooled nights.

The San Diego Zoo Safari Park, formerly named the San Diego Wild Animal Park, occupies  in the valley.

The San Pasqual and Clevenger Canyon Open Space Park is located at the eastern end of the valley.

San Pasqual Academy, a first-in-the-nation residential education campus designed specifically for foster youth, serves as a placement option for dependents of the Juvenile Court, 12–17 years old, and Non-Minor Dependents (NMDs) up to age 19 years old.

The residential area located in the mountains that border the valley, near the agricultural preserve, is officially named Rancho San Pasqual. Locals often refer to it as "Eagle Crest",  the name of the 18-hole golf course that surrounds the neighborhood.

References

External links

Wine Institute
San Pasqual and Clevenger Canyon Open Space Park
San Pasqual Valley Open Space Conservation Plan
The history of the San Pasqual Trussells

Neighborhoods in San Diego
Valleys of San Diego County, California
San Antonio–San Diego Mail Line
Stagecoach stops in the United States